Meopta Mikroma is an all metal 16mm subminiature camera made by Meopta in Czechoslovakia, after World War II.

Features
Dimension: 74mm x 35mm x 28mm
Weight: 225g
Lens: Meopta Mirar 20mm /3.5 triplet (Cooke style)
Focusing dial (Meter) 0.5，0.7，1，1.2；1.3，1.5，1.7，2，2.5，3.5，50，10，infinity
Aperture 3.5-16
Counter: 1 to 50
Mechanical shutter
Mikroma B,25,50,100,200
Mikroma II B,5,10,25,50,100,200,400
Film: 16mm single perforated film
Frame size 11.5 x14

Accessories
Copy stand
Close up attachment lens 0.33-0.5m, 0.5-1m
Filter set: ultraviolet, yellow, red, green, light green
Supply side cassette and take up side cassette
16mm Meopta development tank
Genuine leather case

Pictures

References

External links
Mikroma II
 Mikroma II
flickr

Subminiature cameras